The 1983 Chico State Wildcats football team represented California State University, Chico as a member of the Northern California Athletic Conference (NCAC) during the 1983 NCAA Division II football season. Led by Dick Trimmer in his tenth and final season as head coach, Chico State compiled an overall record of 4–5–1 with a mark of 3–2–1 in conference play,  placing third in the NCAC. The team outscored its opponents 227 to 201 for the season. The Wildcats played home games at University Stadium in Chico, California.

Trimmer finished his tenure at Chico State with an overall record of 48–52–2, for a .480 winning percentage.

Schedule

References

Chico State
Chico State Wildcats football seasons
Chico State Wildcats football